The 108th Pennsylvania House of Representatives District is located in Montour County and Northumberland County and includes the following areas:

 All of Montour County
 Northumberland County
 Delaware Township
 East Chillisquaque Township
 Lewis Township
 McEwensville
 Milton
 Northumberland
 Point Township
 Riverside
 Rockefeller Township
 Rush Township

 Northumberland County (continued)
 Snydertown
 Sunbury 
 Turbot Township
 Turbotville
 Upper Augusta Township
 Watsontown
 West Chillisquaque Township

Representatives

References

Sources 
 

Government of Northumberland County, Pennsylvania
Government of Snyder County, Pennsylvania
108